The Uflyand-Mindlin theory of vibrating plates is an extension of Kirchhoff–Love plate theory that takes into account shear deformations through-the-thickness of a plate.  The theory was proposed in 1948 by Yakov Solomonovich Uflyand (1916-1991) and in 1951 by Raymond Mindlin with Mindlin making reference to Uflyand's work. Hence, this theory has to be referred to as Uflyand-Mindlin plate theory, as is done in the handbook by Elishakoff, and in papers by Andronov, Elishakoff, Hache and Challamel, Loktev, Rossikhin and Shitikova and Wojnar. In 1994, Elishakoff suggested to neglect the fourth-order time derivative in Uflyand-Mindlin equations. A similar, but not identical, theory in static setting, had been proposed earlier by Eric Reissner in 1945.  Both theories are intended for thick plates in which the normal to the mid-surface remains straight but not necessarily perpendicular to the mid-surface.  The Uflyand-Mindlin theory is used to calculate the deformations and stresses in a plate whose thickness is of the order of one tenth the planar dimensions while the Kirchhoff–Love theory is applicable to thinner plates.

The form of Uflyand-Mindlin plate theory that is most commonly used is actually due to Mindlin. The Reissner theory is slightly different and is a static counterpart of the Uflyand-Mindlin theory. Both theories include in-plane shear strains and both are extensions of Kirchhoff–Love plate theory incorporating first-order shear effects.

Uflyand-Mindlin's theory assumes that there is a linear variation of displacement across the plate thickness but that the plate thickness does not change during deformation.  An additional assumption is that the normal stress through the thickness is ignored; an assumption which is also called the plane stress condition.  On the other hand, Reissner's static theory assumes that the bending stress is linear while the shear stress is quadratic through the
thickness of the plate.  This leads to a situation where the displacement through-the-thickness is not necessarily linear and where the plate thickness may change during deformation.  Therefore, Reissner's static theory does not invoke the plane stress condition.

The Uflyand-Mindlin theory is often called the first-order shear deformation theory of plates.  Since a first-order shear deformation theory implies a linear displacement variation through the thickness, it is incompatible with Reissner's static plate theory.

Mindlin theory
Mindlin's theory was originally derived for isotropic plates using equilibrium considerations by Uflyand.  A more general version of the theory based on energy considerations is discussed here.

Assumed displacement field
The Mindlin hypothesis implies that the displacements in the plate have the form

 is the displacement of the mid-surface in the  direction,  and  designate the angles which the normal to the mid-surface makes with the  axis.

Strain-displacement relations
Depending on the amount of rotation of the plate normals two different approximations for the strains can be derived from the basic kinematic assumptions.

For small strains and small rotations the strain–displacement relations for Mindlin–Reissner plates are

The shear strain, and hence the shear stress, across the thickness of the plate is not neglected in this theory.  However, the shear strain is constant across the thickness of the plate.  This cannot be accurate since the shear stress is known to be parabolic even for simple plate geometries.  To account for the inaccuracy in the shear strain, a shear correction factor is applied so that the correct amount of internal energy is predicted by the theory.  Then

Equilibrium equations
The equilibrium equations of a Mindlin–Reissner plate for small strains and small rotations have the form

where  is an applied out-of-plane load, the in-plane stress resultants are defined as

the moment resultants are defined as

and the shear resultants are defined as

{| class="toccolours collapsible collapsed" width="60%" style="text-align:left"
!Derivation of equilibrium equations
|-
|
For the situation where the strains and rotations of the plate are small the virtual internal energy is given by

where the stress resultants and stress moment resultants are defined in a way similar to that for Kirchhoff plates.  The shear resultant is defined as

Integration by parts gives

The symmetry of the stress tensor implies that  and
.  Hence,

For the special case when the top surface of the plate is loaded by a force per unit area , the virtual work done by the external forces is

Then, from the principle of virtual work,

Using standard arguments from the calculus of variations, the equilibrium equations for a Mindlin–Reissner plate are

|}

Boundary conditions
The boundary conditions are indicated by the boundary terms in the principle of virtual work.

If the only external force is a vertical force on the top surface of the plate, the boundary conditions are

Stress–strain relations
The stress–strain relations for a linear elastic Mindlin–Reissner plate are given by

Since  does not appear in the equilibrium equations it is implicitly assumed that it does not have any effect on the momentum balance and is neglected.  This assumption is also called the plane stress assumption.  The remaining stress–strain relations for an orthotropic material, in matrix form, can be written as

Then

and

For the shear terms

The  extensional stiffnesses are the quantities

The  bending stiffnesses are the quantities

Mindlin theory for isotropic plates 
For uniformly thick, homogeneous, and isotropic plates, the stress–strain relations 
in the plane of the plate are 

where  is the Young's modulus,  is the Poisson's ratio, and 
 are the in-plane strains.  The through-the-thickness shear 
stresses and strains are related by 

where  is the shear modulus.

Constitutive relations 
The relations between the stress resultants and the generalized deformations are,

and

The bending rigidity is defined as the quantity

For a plate of thickness  ( of the following all indicates thickness), the bending rigidity has the form

Governing equations 
If we ignore the in-plane extension of the plate, the governing equations are

In terms of the generalized deformations, these equations can be written as

{| class="toccolours collapsible collapsed" width="60%" style="text-align:left"
!Derivation of equilibrium equations in terms of deformations
|-
|
If we expand out the governing equations of a Mindlin plate, we have

Recalling that

and combining the three governing equations, we have

If we define

we can write the above equation as

Similarly, using the relationships between the shear force resultants and the deformations,
and the equation for the balance of shear force resultants, we can show that

third equation which can be found by differentiating the expressions for the shear force
resultants and the governing equations in terms of the moment resultants, and equating these.
The resulting equation has the form

Therefore, the three governing equations in terms of the deformations are

|}
The boundary conditions along the edges of a rectangular plate are

Relationship to Reissner's static theory
The canonical constitutive relations for shear deformation theories of isotropic 
plates can be expressed as

.  If we define a Marcus moment,

we can express the shear resultants as

These relations and the governing equations of equilibrium, when combined, lead to the
following canonical equilibrium equations in terms of the generalized displacements.

where

In Mindlin's theory,  is the transverse displacement of the mid-surface of the plate
The canonical parameters for this theory
The shear correction factor  usually has the
value .

On the other hand, in Reissner's theory,  is the weighted average transverse deflection
those in Mindlin's theory.

Relationship to Kirchhoff–Love theory
If we define the moment sum for Kirchhoff–Love theory as

we can show that 

where  is a biharmonic function such that .  We can also
show that, if  is the displacement predicted for a Kirchhoff–Love plate,

where  is a function that satisfies the Laplace equation, .  The
rotations of the normal are related to the displacements of a Kirchhoff–Love plate by

where

References

See also 
Bending
Bending of plates
Infinitesimal strain theory
Linear elasticity
Plate theory
Stress (mechanics)
Stress resultants
Vibration of plates

Continuum mechanics